Helga Pakasaar is a contemporary art curator and writer based in Vancouver, Canada. She has worked as curator at Polygon Gallery (formerly Presentation House Gallery) since 2003 and is now the Audain Chief Curator of Polygon. She has also curated exhibitions for Griffin Art Projects in North Vancouver and previously worked as a curator at the Art Gallery of Windsor and the Walter Phillips Gallery.

Curatorial work 
Pakasaar has curated several exhibitions focusing on historical and contemporary photography and media art, such as C. 1983 and Not Necessarily In That Order. Her curatorial endeavours encompass multi-venue contemporary art projects, including Moodyville, featuring a special issue of The Capilano Review, and Territory, produced in partnership with Artspeak, Vancouver. As curator at the Polygon Gallery, Pakasaar presented photography by world-famous artists based both in western Canada and internationally, including the photoconceptual artist Ian Wallace.  

In 2015, Pakasaar curated the inaugural exhibition at Griffen Art Projects, showcasing art held in private collections and emphasizing the role of women collectors.

Selected curatorial projects 
 Jeremy Shaw: DMT, September 16, 2004 — October 24, 2004, Presentation House Gallery. 
 Jack Goldstein: Under Water Sea Fantasy, September 16, 2004 — October 24, 2004, Presentation House Gallery. 
 Andrew Wright: Skies, November 5, 2004 — December 19, 2004, Presentation House Gallery. 
 Kevin Schmidt: Fog, November 5, 2004 — December 19, 2004, Presentation House Gallery. 
 Althea Thauberger: A Memory Lasts Forever, March 30, 2005 — April 5, 2005, Presentation House Gallery.
 Christine Davis: Drink Me, April 30, 2005 — June 5, 2005, Presentation House Gallery. 
 Judy Radul: Downes Point and So Departed (Again), September 10, 2005 — October 23, 2005, Presentation House Gallery. 
 Territory, June 10, 2006 — August 6, 2006, Presentation House Gallery. 
 Tichy, November 18, 2006 — January 14, 2007, Presentation House Gallery. 
 Laszlo Moholy-Nagy & Simon Starling, March 24, 2007 — April 29, 2007, Presentation House Gallery. 
 Moodyville, June 3, 2008 — June 15, 2008, Presentation House Gallery. 
 Juliette and Friends, November 22, 2008 — January 11, 2008, Presentation House Gallery. 
 Isabelle Pauwels: B and E, January 31, 2009 — March 22, 2009, Presentation House Gallery. 
 The Malcolmson Collection, October 1, 2009 — December 20, 2009, Presentation House Gallery. 
 Not Necessarily in that Order, May 1, 2010 — July 11, 2010, Presentation House Gallery. 
 Flakey: The Early Works of Glenn Lewis, September 11, 2010 — November 14, 2010, Presentation House Gallery.
 Glenn Lewis: Room Divided, September 29, 2010 — October 17, 2010, Satellite Gallery, Vancouver. 
 Glenn Lewis: Four Intersections, October 21, 2010 — November 7, 2010, Satellite Gallery, Vancouver. 
 Larry Clark, Tulsa, September 10, 2011 — November 13, 2011, Presentation House Gallery. 
 Kohei Yoshiyuki: The Park, September 10, 2011 — November 13, 2011, Presentation House Gallery. 
 C.1983, January 27, 2012 — March 11, 2012, Presentation House Gallery.  
 C.1983 Part II, March 23, 2012 — May 6, 2012, Presentation House Gallery. 
 Phantasmagoria, May 24, 2012 — July 22, 2012, Presentation House Gallery. 
 Anna Oppermann / Andrea Pinheiro / Marianne Wex, January 19, 2013 — March 24, 2013, Presentation House Gallery. 
 News!, February 14, 2013 — March 30, 2013, Satellite Gallery, Vancouver. 
 Zhang Yaxin: Model Opera, June 14, 2013 — July 26, 2013, Presentation House Gallery. 
 Another Happy Day: Found Photographs Collected by Jonah Samson, September 12, 2013 — November 24, 2013, Presentation House Gallery.
 Cindy Sherman Meets Dzunuk’Wa: From The Michael And Inna O’Brian Collection, February 14, 2014 — March 29, 2014, Satellite Gallery, Vancouver.
 Stan Douglas: Synthetic Pictures, March 21, 2014 — May 25, 2014, Presentation House Gallery. 
 A Thousand Quarrels: Liz Magor, June 7, 2014 — August 3, 2014, Presentation House Gallery. 
 Lee Friedlander: Thick of Things, November 29, 2014 — February 8, 2015, Presentation House Gallery. 
 Tris Vonna-Michell, April 23, 2015 — May 31, 2015, Presentation House Gallery. 
 Eye to Eye, June 14, 2015 — July 26, 2015, Presentation House Gallery. 
 New York Art Book Fair 2015, September 18, 2015 — September 20, 2015, Presentation House Gallery.
 B.C. Almanac(H) C-B, September 30, 2015 — November 29, 2015, Presentation House Gallery.
 Isabelle Pauwels: Lying Stills / Constructing Truth With Photography, March 28, 2016 — July 31, 2016, Waterfront Station, All lines, Vancouver, BC. 
 Nanitch: Early Photographs Of British Columbia From The Langmann Collection, March 30, 2016 — June 26, 2016, Presentation House Gallery.

Honours
 Alvin Balkind Curator's Prize, 2013

References

Canadian art curators
Canadian women non-fiction writers
Writers from Vancouver
Living people
Year of birth missing (living people)
Place of birth missing (living people)
Canadian women curators